Tatjana Kivimägi, (transliterated Tatyana Kivimyagi; born 23 June 1984) is a Russian-Estonian high jumper.

Career
She finished fifth at the 2005 European Indoor Championships and sixth at the 2005 World Athletics Final. She competed at the 2004 Summer Olympics and the 2005 World Championships without reaching the finals.

Her personal best jump is 1.98 metres, achieved in August 2004 in Moscow and repeated in June 2005 in Florence, in January 2008 in Moscow (indoor) and in July 2008 in Kazan.

Personal life
She was born as Tatyana Novoseltseva in Bryansk. She is now married to her coach Mihhail Kivimägi, a retired decathlete and an Estonian national. On 18 December 2008 the Government of Estonia granted to Tatjana Kivimägi Estonian citizenship for special merit.

References

1984 births
Living people
Sportspeople from Bryansk
Russian female high jumpers
Estonian female high jumpers
Athletes (track and field) at the 2004 Summer Olympics
Olympic athletes of Russia